Geilenkirchen is a town in the district Heinsberg, in North Rhine-Westphalia, Germany. It is situated near the border with the Netherlands, on the river Wurm, approx. 15 km (9.3 mi) north-east of Heerlen and 20 km (12.4 mi) north of Aachen.

It was the site of Operation Clipper in November 1944.

The town gives its name to nearby NATO Air Base Geilenkirchen.  The base is home to 17 E-3A airborne early warning and control aircraft manned by crews from 14 nations.

On July 24, 2019 the highest temperature ever recorded in Germany was measured in Geilenkirchen at  during a heat wave that affected much of Europe. The record was broken the following day when temperature in Lingen reached .

Born in Geilenkirchen 

 Ludolf Camphausen (1803–1890), banker, Prussian minister president in the revolutionary year 1848
 Otto von Camphausen (1812–1896), Prussian Finance Minister
 Christoph Dohmen (born 1957), professor of the Old Testament at the University of Regensburg
 Hans Meyer (1900–1962), German physician and ministerial official
 Max Wilms (1867–1918), German physician and surgeon

References

Heinsberg (district)
Districts of the Rhine Province